The 2008 congressional elections in Oklahoma were held on November 4, 2008 to determine who will represent the state of Oklahoma in the United States House of Representatives. Oklahoma has five seats in the House, apportioned according to the 2000 United States census. Representatives are elected for two-year terms; whoever is elected will serve in the 111th Congress from January 4, 2009 until January 3, 2011. The election coincided with the 2008 U.S. presidential election.

Overview

District 1

The district was focused in the northeastern corner of the state and included the Tulsa metropolitan area as well as all of Tulsa County. It also included Washington County, Wagoner County, and parts of Rogers County and Creek County. It had been represented by Republican John A. Sullivan since February 2002. The Democratic nominee was Georgianna Oliver, a CEO residing in Tulsa. CQ Politics forecasted the race as 'Safe Republican'.

District 2

This district covers roughly the eastern quarter of the state, and has been represented by Democrat Dan Boren since 2005.  His Republican challenger was Raymond Wickson of Okmulgee. CQ Politics forecasted the race as 'Safe Democrat'.

District 3

This district covers the Oklahoma Panhandle and northwest half of the state, including portions of Oklahoma City and Tulsa. It has been represented by Republican Frank Lucas since May 1994. The Democratic nominee was engineer and USDA Forest Service employee Frankie Robbins. CQ Politics forecasted the race as 'Safe Republican'.

District 4

This district covers the south-central area, and has been represented by Republican Tom Cole since 2003. The Democratic nominee was oil industry land consultant Blake Cummings. CQ Politics forecasts the race as 'Safe Republican'.

District 5

This district covers the central part of the state and includes Oklahoma City, the state capital. It has been represented by Republican Mary Fallin since 2007. Lawyer and Democratic nominee Steven Perry challenged the freshman incumbent, campaigning on a platform focused on using American and not foreign energy. CQ Politics forecasted the race as 'Safe Republican'.

References

External links
Oklahoma State Election Board
U.S. Congress candidates for Oklahoma at Project Vote Smart
Oklahoma U.S. House Races from 2008 Race Tracker
Campaign contributions for Oklahoma congressional races from OpenSecrets

2008
Oklahoma
United States House of Representatives